The following is a list of Grand Chiefs (Mi'kmaq) who have presided over the Grand Council (Mi'kmaq). The Grand Council was organized in the 18th century in response to the collapse of French power in the region. Previously the Miꞌkmaq had operated in 14-15 independent bands in Miꞌkmaꞌki.

Notes

References 
 Official Miꞌkmaq history month Poster 2006
Miꞌkmaq Grand Chiefs - Profiles
 Janet E. Chute. Frank G. Speck's Contributions to the Understanding of Miꞌkmaq Land Use, Leadership, and Land Management. Ethnohistory. June 1, 1999 
Miꞌkmaw Chiefs, 1760

Mi'kmaq in Canada
Culture of Nova Scotia